Litera is an American software corporation headquartered in Chicago, Illinois. They create and license productivity and risk management software. In December 2009, Litera acquired Softwise Inc. in its biggest acquisition to date. The company acquired CitationWare LLC in 2011. In 2013, Litéra acquired AxxiTRIALS clinical-trials portal from web technology specialist Axxiem Web Solutions. In 2019 Litera acquired competing fileshare company Workshare.

Products 

Litera sells documentation automation platforms, server-based document metadata cleaner, PDF editor and binders, Table of Authorities generators, email encryption software, and multiple collaboration platforms.

References 

2001 establishments in the United States
Software companies based in Illinois
Companies established in 2001
Software companies of the United States

2001 establishments in North Carolina
Software companies established in 2001